Leonard Gaston Broughton (December 5, 1865 – February 22, 1936) was a fundamentalist Baptist minister, medical doctor, founder of Tabernacle Baptist Church in Atlanta, Georgia and of Tabernacle Infirmary, which later became Georgia Baptist Hospital.

Early life
Broughton was born in 1865 on a farm in Wake County, North Carolina, about 12 miles outside of Raleigh, North Carolina. He was the second son of Lieutenant Gaston H. Broughton and Louisa Hawkins Franks. His father was a poor farmer who served as an officer in the 26th North Carolina Regiment of the Confederate States Army during the American Civil War, was captured by Union troops at the Battle of Gettysburg, and was held prisoner until the end of the war. After his return from the war, the family moved to Raleigh where the children, including Len, were schooled via the aid of a wealthy uncle, Needham B. Broughton. 

Broughton was a first cousin of State Librarian Carrie Lougee Broughton and U.S. Senator and Governor of North Carolina J. Melville Broughton.

At the age of fourteen, Broughton was baptized into his faith at what was later known as Tabernacle Baptist Church in Raleigh.

Broughton attended Wake Forest College with his brother Charlie though he did not graduate due to illness. (Wake Forest granted him a D.D. later). Broughton went on to attend the Kentucky School of Medicine at Louisville and achieved an M.D.

Career
He moved to Wilson County, North Carolina to practice medicine and it was there that he met his wife Roxana Barnes. He later also practiced medicine in Reidsville, North Carolina for four years. It was there that he contracted Typhoid fever. A long period of recovery helped him make the decision to become a minister.

In March 1891 he became the pastor of a small church in Winston, North Carolina. In the year and a half he was there, the church gained one hundred members. He became known for this and other churches sought his services. He accepted such an offer in November, 1893 at Calvary Church in Roanoke, Virginia.

In March 1898 he became pastor of Third Baptist Church in Atlanta. He had been in Atlanta only a short while when he started a project to build a much larger facility for the congregation, nearer to the center of town, to be known as the Tabernacle. Many of the older members of the church opposed Broughton's plan, and when it passed by a vote of 542 to 240, the church was split into two. Those opposed remained to form Jones Avenue Baptist Church in the existing facility, and the rest went with Broughton to form Tabernacle Baptist Church nearby. On March 5, 1899 a church structure was dedicated but rapid growth quickly rendered it obsolete. On March 9, 1910 the cornerstone was laid on a huge new four-story structure to house the church. (This structure still stands, it is now used as the music venue The Tabernacle). Broughton had a long and successful tenure as pastor of this church, creating many new programs including Tabernacle Infirmary in 1901 (which would later become Georgia Baptist Hospital) and the largest Bible Conference in the South at the time.

Broughton again was receiving many requests to leave his church for posts elsewhere. In 1912 he accepted such an offer of a position at Christ Church in London, England, a church famous among Baptists of the time because of the work of F.B. Meyer. He remained there for over 2 years, but the outbreak of World War I and his own declining health took its toll. He left in 1915 and took a post at First Baptist in Knoxville, Tennessee. From 1923 to 1927, he was the pastor of First Baptist Church in Jacksonville, Florida.

Broughton returned to Tabernacle Baptist Church in Atlanta from 1929 to 1931. He died in 1936 and was buried in Knoxville.

Selected bibliography

References

External links

1865 births
1936 deaths
20th-century Baptist ministers from the United States
Baptists from North Carolina
Len
People from Wake County, North Carolina
People from Atlanta
University of Louisville School of Medicine alumni
Wake Forest University alumni
19th-century Baptist ministers from the United States